Cosmo Pyke is an English singer-songwriter, multi-instrumentalist and artist from London. He gained widespread acclaim for his 2017 EP Just Cosmo which was co-produced with Fraser T. Smith, in association with 70Hz Recordings. Cosmo’s later releases are via his own label, Pykrete Records.

Biography 
Cosmo was born in Peckham, Southeast London. He attended The Brit School for Performing Arts, following famous singer-songwriter alumni Adele, Amy Winehouse, Jamie Woon, Loyle Carner, and more.

Music career 
His 2017 debut EP Just Cosmo was released in collaboration with renowned producer Fraser T. Smith’s (Easy Life, Kano, Stormzy) 70Hz Recordings, and saw Cosmo tipped by numerous tastemakers. Tracks on the EP are ‘Wish You Were Gone’, ‘Chronic Sunshine’, ‘After School Club’, ‘Social Sites’ and ‘Great Dane’.

In 2017, The Guardian described his sound as, ‘a fusion of jazz, 2-tone, Tyler, the Creator and the Kooks.’ Dazed said: ‘Pyke’s songs combine “classical songwriting with a dash of reggae, hip hop, and indie.' Clash commented: 'The Peckham artist excels by channelling a laid back, jazz-inspired vibe, a highly creative songwriting stance that seems to grow with each passing track.'

Cosmo described the EP as: "A documentation of my youth as an ode to my thoughts and feelings, with personal experiences and personal samples. Such as the last track 'Great Dane', which begins and ends with a clip from 'Just William' that I listened to and loved as a child… Fraser T. Smith and I really worked with creating a live sound.”

Ushering in a new chapter in late 2020, Cosmo released the title track from his new EP A Piper For Janet through his own label, Pykrete Records. ‘Piper’ is a reference to artist John Piper; Janet is Cosmo’s beloved late grandmother. The EP was written over a few years while Cosmo was touring across South America and Asia. The rest of the EP was released in January 2021, with the tracklist: ‘A Piper For Janet’, ‘Filet Mignon’, ‘Railroad Tracks’ and ‘Seasick’. 

In late 2021, Cosmo was invited to the Brodie Sessions in Denmark to perform an acoustic set paired with the host team’s dreamy audio-visual production. It was released in January 2022. Other artists who have featured in the sessions include José González, Little Dragon and more.

Discography

EPs 
 2017: Just Cosmo (70Hz)
 2021: A Piper For Janet (Pykrete Records)
 2022: Brodie Sessions (Live) (Pykrete Records)
 2023: Curser's Lament (Pykrete Records)

Press 

Music Week 2016
‘[Cosmo’s EP due in 2017] bends his varying influences (Joni Mitchell, 9th Wonder, Mac DeMarco) into a breezy five-track introduction that could be the most interesting thing Fraser T. Smith has] put his name to in years.'

The Line Of Best Fit at The Great Escape 2017
‘Cosmo Pyke is one of the most effortlessly talented acts of the weekend. [He] strokes his guitar as if swishing through water - fitting, really, as his lo-fi jazz-pop easily lulls the crowd into a blissful trance… Pyke sings about the pleasing banalities of life on a wave of fidgety song structures and complex time signatures. While his voice flirts with soul but lacks a polished finish there's a quirky charm to his tone that, judging by the packed-out Prince Albert, has garnered him a whole host of committed fans.’

The Guardian, 2017
‘If Pyke sounds like a refreshingly different kind of artist, then that’s because he is… an extraordinary personality: like his musicianship – simultaneously catchy and slack – he possesses both the brilliant confidence and unconstructed thought process of someone still figuring things out.’

Dazed 100, No.14, 2017
‘This blissed out musical wunderkind is exporting chronic sunshine from his Peckham bedroom… His Just Cosmo EP deals with a range of topics (some darker than others…) but it’s always his playful personality that shines through.’

The NME 100: Essential new music for 2018
‘We’ve decided that these are, without doubt, the 100 new artists rock-solid guaranteed to make 2018 a magnificent year for your ears… [Cosmo Pyke x Chronic Sunshine] Sounds like: Sunshine-filled pop guaranteed to put a spring in your step… there’s reason to believe the artist has the chops to make it to that level [of Frank Ocean, whose video he appeared in].’

Bandwagon Asia, Cosmo makes his mark in Singapore, 2018
“[Cosmo] is one of the many emerging cultural icons of his generation… this gig proved that he was not only masterful at musically encapsulating the wistfulness of youth but also at being a great performer.”

KTSW, A Piper For Janet EP review, 2021
“Pyke has leveled up exponentially… This [title track] feels huge… Cosmo’s soulful songwriting ability shines the most through [track Filet Mignon]... the genius behind the lyricism in this song is evident… [On song Railroad Tracks] Pyke does this [scream] so effortlessly you would think he was a hall of fame rockstar… this record has the markings of a future legend and a household name… [Seasick sounds like] something composed by the great Frank Zappa…’

Fraser T. Smith via Music Business Worldwide ‘MBW World’s Greatest Producers’, 2022
‘I’ve just been very fortunate to be around great artists… with my label, 70Hz… I’m able to shine a spotlight on incredible talent. And that must always, in some way, shine… It doesn’t always have to be a Dave or a Stormzy. It could be Cosmo Pyke, whose first EP we did. It could be Claire Maguire…”

References 

Year of birth missing (living people)
Living people
English male singer-songwriters
Musicians from London
21st-century Black British male singers
Bedroom pop musicians